

International organisations

African Union (AU)

Economic Community of West African States (ECOWAS)

Economic and Monetary Community of Central Africa (CEMAC)

West African Economic and Monetary Union (UEMOA)

Other organizations
 ACP — European Union:  The 14th ACP-EU Joint Parliamentary Assembly was held in Kigali, Rwanda in November. Resolutions on electoral processes in ACP and EU countries, healthcare and medicine, natural disasters and the situation in the Democratic Republic of Congo were adopted. In addition the Kigali Declaration for development-friendly Economic Partnership Agreements (EPA)s was voted for.

Elections

Conflict and civil war

Darfur conflict

Environment

Human and natural catastrophes

Water

Health

AIDS

Avian influenza

Chikungunya

Cholera

Malaria

Meningitis

Sickle-cell disease

Education

Children's rights

Demography

Sports

Athletics

Basketball
 Basketball at the 2007 All-Africa Games

Boxing

Cycling

Football (soccer)

Handball

Judo

Wrestling

Rugby union

Culture

Art

Film

Music

Festivals

Literature

Science

Economy

See also

2007 in Kenya
2007 in Sierra Leone
2007 in South Africa
2007 in Zimbabwe

Notes
This text is being translated from the original French-language article.

 
2000s in Africa
Years of the 21st century in Africa